Glucan 1,4-alpha-maltotetraohydrolase (exo-maltotetraohydrolase, 1,4-alpha-D-glucan maltotetraohydrolase) is an enzyme with systematic name 4-alpha-D-glucan maltotetraohydrolase. This enzyme catalyses the following chemical reaction

 Hydrolysis of (1->4)-alpha-D-glucosidic linkages in amylaceous polysaccharides, to remove successive maltotetraose residues from the non-reducing chain ends

References

External links 
 

EC 3.2.1